The National Council of Women of Australia (NWA) is an Australian organisation founded in 1931.  The council is an umbrella organisation with which are affiliated seven State and Territory National Councils of Women.  It is non-party political, non-sectarian, volunteer organisation and open to all women. It first affiliated with the International Council of Women in 1896, through the New South Wales NCW.

The Constituent councils were formed in:
 New South Wales −1896
 Tasmania – 1899, 
 Victoria and South Australia – 1902
 National Council of Women of Queensland – 1905
 Western Australia −1911
 Australian Capital Territory −1939
 Northern Territory – 1964.

The NCWA works on a Triennium basis and holds a conference every 18 months to encourage participation in its policy platform.
The Pacific Assembly was a gathering in Brisbane City, Australia, over a three-day period in the 20th century. The assembly was sponsored by the National Council of Women. The gathering included representatives from many different countries around the world.

Notable women
Women associated with the Council include Diane Alley, Yvonne Bain, Gracia Baylor, Ruby Board, Ivy Brookes, Elsie Byth, Margaret Davey, Emily Dobson, Leonie Christopherson, Edith Cowan, Dorothy Edwards, Margaret Findlater-Smith, Maureen Giddings, Ruth Gibson, Vida Goldstein, Ann Hamilton, Irene Longman, Laurel Macintosh, Joyce McConnell, Margaret McIntyre, Thelma Metcalfe, Adelaide Miethke, Mabel Miller, Necia Mocatta, May Moss, Mildred Muscio, Ada Norris, Judith Parker, Audrey Reader, Gwen Roderick, Jessie Scotford, Edith Helen Barrett, Lillias Skene and Zara Aronson.

List of presidents
List of federal presidents of the NCWA:

1906–24: Emily Dobson
1924–27: Lillias Skene
1927–31: Mildred Muscio
1931–36: May Moss
1936–42: Adelaide Miethke
1942–44: Ruby Board
1945–48: Elsie Byth
1948–52: Ivy Brookes
1953–56: Ruth Gibson
1957–60: Thelma Metcalfe
1960–64: Dorothy Edwards
1964–67: Anne Hamilton
1967–70: Ada Norris
1970–73: Jessie Scotford
1973–76: Joyce McConnell
1976–79: Margaret Davey
1979–82: Laurel Macintosh
1982–85: Diane Alley
1985–88: Necia Mocatta
1988–91: Maureen Giddings
1991–94: Yvonne Bain
1994–97: Gwen Roderick
1997–00: Gracia Baylor
2000–03: Judith Parker
2003–06: Leonie Christopherson
2006–09: Hean Bee Wee
2009–12: Margaret Findlater-Smith
2012–15: Julie Morris
2015–18: Barbara Baikie
2018–2021: Robyn Nolan
2021–: Chiou See Anderson

Archives
Its archives – pre the current Triennium – are held by the National Library of Australia for use by researchers.

Records of National Council of Women NSW activity are held by the NSW State & Records Authority, e.g. 1918 correspondence to Minister for Justice concerning women's citizen's rights and conditions of women prisoner.

Works
 Balancing Work and Life – A Guide for Employers and Employees 1999.  To avoid confusion with current day legislation and practice, this booklet is no longer available. 
 From a Camel to the Moon (ISBN 0-646-38702- 2) 1999 An Anthology for the International Year of Older Persons, 
 From the Heart 2002 – Women's experiences of the Australian Outback, to mark the Year of the Outback.
 45 years on:  What now in Contraceptives? Published in 2006 – This booklet includes information about research at the time (2006), with articles by Professor Gab Kovacs, Dr Neisha Wratten, and a piece by Dr Terri Foran on the history of contraceptives.     
 A website has been created as a review of the NCWA President's 1906–2006 – Stirrers with Style.

See also 

Feminism in Australia

References

 "Stirrers with Style" – This electronic exhibition is a project of the National Council of Women of Australia, supported by the NCWA History Steering Committee. Work on this project was generously funded by Australian Research Council Linkage Grant LP088371, in collaboration with the University of Melbourne. This exhibition uses the Online Heritage Resource Manager, a tool developed by the eScholarship Research Centre, part of the University of Melbourne Library. Copyright  National Council of Women of Australia, 2013. Published by the Australian Women's Archives Project http://www.womenaustralia.info/exhib/ncwa

Further reading

External links
NCWA website

Women's organisations based in Australia
1931 establishments in Australia
Organizations established in 1931